The Indian Tomb (Das indische Grabmal in its original German) is a 1959 West German-French-Italian adventure drama film. It was produced by Artur Brauner, directed by Fritz Lang, and stars Debra Paget, Paul Hubschmid, Walter Reyer, Claus Holm, Valéry Inkijinoff, and Sabine Bethma.

It is the second of two feature films, comprising what has come to be known as Fritz Lang's Indian Epic; the first is The Tiger of Eschnapur (Der Tiger von Eschnapur). Both are based on the novel Das indische Grabmal, written by Lang's ex-wife, Thea von Harbou, who died in 1954. In 1960 American International Pictures obtained the rights to both films and combined them into one heavily-edited, 90 minute long feature renamed Journey to the Lost City. After both were dubbed into Spanish, they were shown as separate films, when in fact the second was a direct continuation of the first.

Interiors were shot at the Spandau Studios in West Berlin with sets designed by the art directors Helmut Nentwig and Willy Schatz.

In popular culture
The film is probably best remembered today for Debra Paget's erotically charged "snake dance scene".

Reception
On review aggregation website Rotten Tomatoes, the film had an approval rating of 88% based on 8 reviews. Die Welt wrote: "Here lies Fritz Lang, once creator of important films like Metropolis and M. The 'Indian tomb' is his own." [i.e, grave as a filmmaker] In contrast to those earlier opinions, contemporary American film critics are positive about the film.

See also
 The Indian Tomb (1921 film)

Notes

External links
 
 A  from The Indian Tomb (Debra Paget dancing with a cobra)
 "Three and a half Tombs" - article about the genesis of the book and the films made from it
 "Come On, Baby, Be My Tiger" - article about the several versions of the film
 Artur-Brauner-Archive at the Deutsches Filmmuseum in Frankfurt (German), containing the production files for this movie

1959 films
1950s adventure drama films
1959 romantic drama films
German adventure films
West German films
French drama films
Italian drama films
1950s German-language films
Films based on works by Thea von Harbou
Films directed by Fritz Lang
Films scored by Michel Michelet
Films set in India
Films with screenplays by Fritz Lang
Remakes of German films
Films shot at Spandau Studios
1950s Italian films
1950s French films
1950s German films